Bethenny & Fredrik is an American reality television series that premiered on Bravo on February 6, 2018. The show chronicled Bethenny Frankel and Fredrik Eklund's friendship and business partnership as they come together as real estate moguls.

Episodes

References

External links

2010s American reality television series
2018 American television series debuts
English-language television shows
Bravo (American TV network) original programming
2018 American television series endings